NGC 4121 is a dwarf elliptical galaxy in the constellation Draco.

References

External links
 

NGC 4121
Draco (constellation)
NGC 4121
4121
38508